Peter Anthony Butler  (born 22 November 1949) is a Professor of Physics at the University of Liverpool. He was elected a Fellow of the Royal Society (FRS) in 2019 for "substantial contributions to the improvement of natural knowledge".

He was educated at Borden Grammar School, King's College London (BSc) and the University of Liverpool (PhD, 1974).

His research area is experimental nuclear physics, especially structure of heavy nuclei. He led a group at ISOLDE at CERN who discovered 2013 nuclei with permanent octupole form (pear-shaped).

References

1949 births
Living people
People educated at Borden Grammar School
Alumni of King's College London
Alumni of the University of Liverpool
Fellows of the Royal Society
Fellows of the Institute of Physics
Academics of the University of Liverpool

People associated with CERN